Raimondo Boucheron (March 15, 1800 – February 28, 1876) was an Italian composer, chiefly of sacred music.  During his life, he was known primarily for the song "Inno per le cinque giornate".  Today he is remembered as one of the contributors to the Messa per Rossini, for which he wrote the Confutatis and Oro supplex of the Sequentia.  He also served for a time as maestro di cappella of Milan Cathedral, being succeeded in the post by Guglielmo Quarenghi.

References
Biography at Answers.com

External links
 
 Boucheron, Raimondo, Dizionario Biografico degli Italiani
 

1800 births
1876 deaths
Italian male composers
19th-century Italian composers
19th-century Italian male musicians